Burn Burn Burn is a 2015 British black comedy film, the directorial debut of Chanya Button. The film is a coming-of-age tale, written by Charlie Covell and inspired by the Jack Kerouac novel On the Road published in 1957. The film had its World premiere at the BFI London Film Festival 2015.

Plot
The plot follows the story of two women, Seph (Laura Carmichael) and Alex (Chloe Pirrie), taking a road trip to follow the instructions of their close friend Dan, who has died and given them instructions where to scatter his ashes. The ashes (stored in tupperware in the glove compartment) keep diminishing in quantity as the trip progresses.

Cast

Reception
Writing in The Guardian, Peter Bradshaw described the film as "a sort of millennials mashup of Laughter in Paradise and Last Orders." Bradshaw notes that, "It's not the most original premise, but it's very nicely acted by Carmichael and Perrie (who was the lead in Scott Graham’s 2012 movie Shell). There are some great cameos from Julian Rhind-Tutt and Alison Steadman, and some startling moments, such as the surreal scene in which Alex has to play the crucified Christ in an am-dram production of the Passion, and makes a personal confession from the cross".

The Guardian critic, Wendy Ide added, "The approach is a blend of comedy of discomfort – a brilliant cameo by Julian Rhind-Tutt is mortifyingly funny – and sober reflection on lives that have reached a turning point. It's not wholly original, but Burn Burn Burn is nicely acted and emotionally authentic. Button shows real promise as a director".

On Rotten Tomatoes, the film has an approval rating of 92% based on reviews from 12 critics.

Awards
The film won the Grand Prix at Odessa International Film Festival in Ukraine in 2016.

References

External links
 

2015 films
2015 black comedy films
Films set in England
British black comedy films
Films about death
2010s English-language films
2010s British films